Courtney Rheagan Wallace (born June 9, 1987) is an American actress who had a brief recurring role as Georgia Huffington on the television series 7th Heaven. Her other television credits include Agents of S.H.I.E.L.D., Devious Maids, CSI: Crime Scene Investigation, ER, That's So Raven, Malcolm in the Middle, NYPD Blue, Judging Amy and Walker, Texas Ranger, among other series.

Rheagan was born in Dallas, Texas. She played a role as a child in the game Harvester.

In 2011, Rheagan played Deede Wallrath, the daughter of Texas agricultural tycoon Richard "Dick" Wallrath (portrayed by Jon Gries) in the film Deep in the Heart (which premiered at the Austin Film Festival on October 23, 2011).

Her most recent performance, the tenth installment of the Hellraiser franchise, in the 2018 Hellraiser: Judgment. Rheagan plays Alison Carter, the wife of Detective Sean Carter.

Filmography

References

External links

1987 births
20th-century American actresses
21st-century American actresses
Actresses from Texas
American child actresses
American film actresses
American television actresses
Living people
People from Dallas